Human and Ecological Risk Assessment is a bimonthly peer-reviewed scientific journal covering risk analysis as it relates to environmental health and ecology. It was established in 1995 and is published by Taylor & Francis. It is the official journal of the Association for Environmental Health and Sciences Foundation. The editor-in-chief is Mark Gregory Robson (Rutgers University). According to the Journal Citation Reports, the journal has a 2019 impact factor of 2.30, ranking it 149th out of 225 journals in the category "Environmental Sciences".

References

External links

Risk analysis
Environmental health journals
Ecology journals
Taylor & Francis academic journals
Publications established in 1995
Bimonthly journals
English-language journals